was a noted Japanese author.

Yagi was born in Muroran, Hokkaidō, and graduated from Waseda University in 1938 with a degree in French literature. In 1944 he became employed in the chemical industry in Manchuria. As a writer, he was a devotee of Fyodor Dostoyevsky and Takeo Arishima, and received the 1944 Akutagawa Prize for 劉廣福 Ryūkanbu and the 1976 Yomiuri Prize for Kazamatsuri. Some of his materials are now exhibited in Muroran's Literature Museum.

His Dharma name was Keiunin Zuishin Gitoku Koji (景雲院随心義徳居士).

References

Further reading
 Japanese Wikipedia article
 Who's who among Japanese writers, Nihon Yunesuko Kokunai, Japanese National Commission for UNESCO, Japan P.E.N. Club, 1957.

External links
 Hokkaido Guide: Places to Visit

1911 births
1999 deaths
Japanese writers
People from Muroran, Hokkaido
Writers from Hokkaido
Akutagawa Prize winners
Yomiuri Prize winners
20th-century novelists
20th-century Buddhists
Japanese Buddhists